Walter Henry Gage,  (March 5, 1905 – October 3, 1978) was a Canadian professor and educational icon, widely acknowledged to have had a large impact on students during his 50 year career at the University of British Columbia, where he rose from undergraduate student to university president.

Personal Details

Biography

Walter Gage was born into a family in the middle-class neighbourhood of South Vancouver. His parents, Alexander and Ann, were immigrants from Great Britain and raised Walter and his older sister Elsie. They also influenced both the siblings on community and politics. Walter attended Tecumseh Elementary and John Oliver Secondary School in Vancouver and showed an early interest in his studies. As a teenager, he taught Sunday school and coached basketball. Gage was the first in his family to attend university when he enrolled in UBC in 1921, at the beginning of its development into one of Canada’s premier universities. He went on to earn a Bachelor of Arts, Honours in Mathematics, in 1925, and a Masters of Arts in Mathematics in 1926. 
]
He went on to teach mathematics  at the University of British Columbia over a period of more than fifty years, from 1927 until his death in 1978, a span interrupted only when he taught mathematics at Victoria College (1927–1933) and served as its registrar (1929–1933).

While continuing to teach mathematics to a wide range of students, he served as Dean of Administrative and Inter-Faculty Affairs and Dean of Inter-Faculty and Student Affairs.  In those roles he was renowned for helping students, personally as well as through his office, in an effort to assure that capable students would not be denied a university education because of personal adversities or financial hardship. 
]
Walter Gage served as the 6th President of the University of British Columbia during a turbulent period of social change and growth (1969-1975) . In hindsight, his somewhat reluctant acceptance of the challenging leadership role was acknowledged by the 15th President as important to the university’s ability to weather the turbulence.

Unlike other presidents, he loved teaching and continued to teach and inspire students before, during and after his term as President. His lifelong commitment to excellence in teaching was recognized in 1969 when he became the inaugural recipient of the university’s annual Walter Koerner Master Teacher Award.

Gage helped thousands of students achieve their life goals, whether he was teaching them, counselling them on their education or helping them with bursaries and scholarships. He was known for his wit and sense of humour, for emptying his pockets on the spot for a student in need, for his affection for the arts — especially theatre and music — and for his bombastic classroom style that often left him standing at the blackboard in a cloud of chalk dust.

An excerpt from the citation for the honorary degree awarded to him by the University of British Columbia in 1958 affirmed that Walter Gage was ‘the most and best beloved of the university family’, referring to him as ‘in a sense, the physical embodiment of this university’s academic conscience, and a man whose scholarly attainments and standards of teaching are equaled only by his concern always to do justice to colleagues and students alike’.  He was later awarded an Honorary LL.D. by the University of Victoria, where he had taught and was similarly revered.

In 1971, his lifetime of achievement and excellence in advancing university education was recognized by his investiture as a Companion of the Order of Canada, the highest rank in Canada’s highest civilian honour system.

He died in 1978. Following his death in 1978, the Walter Gage Residence for students at the University of British Columbia was named to honour his legacy.

A book was published in 2018 detailing the life and work of Walter Gage. The Age of Walter Gage: How One Canadian Shaped The Lives of Thousands is the story of how Gage not only redefined teaching as a profession — his overflowing classes were filled not only with eager students but with much laughter — but also guided the future of the growing UBC campus. The book chronicles the fascinating and unforgettable legacy of an individual who rose from humble beginnings to become a profoundly positive influence on the lives of thousands of young Canadians.

References

1905 births
1978 deaths
20th-century Canadian mathematicians
Canadian university and college faculty deans
Companions of the Order of Canada
Scientists from Vancouver
Presidents of the University of British Columbia
University of British Columbia alumni